Pablo Kleinman (born 1971) is an Argentine-born American entrepreneur and talk show host, pioneer of the development of online services in Latin America. Until January 2021, he was the host of Radio California Libre (Radio Free California), produced by Univision's Los Angeles flagship talk radio KTNQ. He is currently the Head of Content and Operations at Voz Media, a Dallas-based U.S. Hispanic media company.

He graduated from the USC School of International Relations (USC, Los Angeles) and went on to study at the London Business School and at the HEC School of Management in Paris, where he obtained an MBA.

Early life 
Kleinman was born in Argentina into a family of Polish-Jewish origin. He attended elementary school in Buenos Aires and finished the first year at the renowned Colegio Nacional de Buenos Aires before he immigrated to the United States at age 13, settling in the city of Los Angeles with his parents and siblings. His great-grandmother, however, had arrived in the United States via Ellis Island in the 1930s and his extended family has kept a permanent presence in Southern California since the 1940s. Since 2017 he has resided in Miami with his wife and children.

Technology pioneer 

In 1986, at age 15, Pablo set up an electronic bulletin board system (BBS) in Buenos Aires called "TCC: The Computer Connection" which was one of the first in the region and the first to run under a Microsoft-designed platform. A year later, TCC became FidoCenter, the first node of the worldwide FidoNet network in Latin America. Pablo Kleinman was the coordinator of FidoNet for the whole of Latin America (FidoNet's Zone 4) between 1987 and 1991. During that period, FidoNet became the largest public-access computer network in the region. It grew throughout the different countries in the region and reached several hundreds of access points in dozens of Latin American cities. He was also the author of WorldPol, a policy proposal that was published originally in 1991 and constituted the first democratic organization proposal in cyberspace.

Many of the original participants of FidoNet in Latin America became the pioneers of the Internet in the following years. Pablo Kleinman was an active participant of the first Spanish-language newsgroups and was one of the founders of several of the Usenet groups dedicated to Latin American countries. Shortly after and during the following ten years, he participated in the founding of several online services companies, among them, Urbita Network, a series of travel and local-information online websites and apps with several million active users.

Journalism and media 
Kleinman began working as a journalist in 1989 as Latin American correspondent for Billboard magazine, the first one to cover the region for the prestigious trade publication.

In 2004, he founded and became editor-in-chief of Diario de América, the oldest political-opinion journal edited in Spanish in the United States. Around the same time, he became a syndicated writer, with columns regularly published in newspapers throughout Latin America and Spain, such as Chile's El Mercurio and La Nación, Panama's Panamá América and La Prensa, Nicaragua's La Prensa, Peru's El Comercio, Paraguay's Diario ABC Color, Venezuela's Diario 2001, Uruguay's El País, Costa Rica's La Nación, among others, as well as in the United States and the Middle East. Kleinman is also a frequent commentator on a few Spanish-language current affairs television programs, including the nighttime news on the Telemundo Network's Los Angeles station. He has also been featured on English-language television newscasts in the U.S. and Canada, usually talking about Latin American issues.

In April 2013, Pablo Kleinman became publisher of El Medio, the first Spanish-language political opinion journal about the Middle East. The magazine became known for espousing a pro-Western editorial line, something uncommon among most Spanish-language publications. It features points of view generally favorable to the United States, to Israel, and to supporters of liberal democracy throughout the Middle East.

Pablo regularly guest hosted the daily current affairs show, initially just on Los Angeles's KTNQ and later also on Univision's nationwide talk radio network, Univision America, between 2009 and 2014. He later hosted the conservative Radio California Libre (Radio Free California) program on KTNQ from late 2019 until it was cancelled in January 2021 shortly after the 2021 United States Capitol attack, with Kleinman saying it was possibly related to his comments alleging election irregularities during the 2020 United States presidential election.

Political career 

Kleinman describes himself as being politically center-right. In early 2009, he took to organizing the Fundación Californiana or Californiana Foundation, a Section 501(c)(3) educational charity dedicated to reaffirming the notion of Hispanics as part of the mainstream of American society, primarily through its Romualdo Pacheco Initiative, and to educating the public on the principles of individual self-reliance and market economics in both English and Spanish.

In February 2014, Kleinman announced that he was running for United States Congress in California's 30th congressional district, against long-time incumbent Democrat Brad Sherman.  Despite the poor brand image of the Republican Party in Los Angeles and the local trend of moderate Republicans running as Independents, Kleinman ran in the Primary as a GOP candidate and as a self-described New Generation Republican. Pablo Kleinman's campaign as the first Hispanic Jewish candidate in a heavily Jewish and Hispanic district generated attention by the media in an area where Democrats have won every election for many years. As a political outsider, he encountered difficulty getting endorsements from members of the Republican establishment, although he did secure prominent endorsements from Conservative Talk Radio hosts as well as from well-known local community figures. Kleinman lost the June 3rd, 2014 primary.

He is a former delegate and member of the executive committee of the California Republican Party. On June 7, 2016, he was elected to the central committee of the Los Angeles County Republican Party for a four-year (2016–2020) term.

Kleinman signed the Madrid Charter, a document drafted by the conservative Spanish political party Vox that describes left-wing groups as enemies of Ibero-America involved in a "criminal project" that are "under the umbrella of the Cuban regime".

Philanthropy

Kleinman is vice-president and a Member of the Board of Trustees of the Hispanic Jewish Foundation in Spain, which is building the Hispanic-Jewish Museum in the Spanish capital. He is also the President of a sister charity based in Miami, called the Hispanic-Jewish Endowment.

References

External links
Pablo Kleinman's Flickr photo page
Diario de América - America's Daily (in Spanish)
Urbita: I love this place!
Revista El Medio
Article from the newspaper O Globo (Rio de Janeiro, Brazil) about the foundational meeting of FidoNet in that country (May 20th, 1991, in Portuguese)

1971 births
Living people
American computer businesspeople
American columnists
American political commentators
Jewish American journalists
American male journalists
American people of Argentine-Jewish descent
Argentine emigrants to the United States
Argentine Jews
Argentine people of Polish-Jewish descent
Businesspeople from Buenos Aires
California Republicans
FidoNet
Alumni of London Business School
HEC Paris alumni
USC School of International Relations alumni
21st-century American Jews
Signers of the Madrid Charter